The Irish Film Institute (IFI), formerly the Irish Film Centre, is both an arthouse cinema and a national body that supports Irish film heritage. The IFI presents film festivals, retrospectives and curated seasons, along with independent, Irish and foreign language films overlooked by commercial multiplexes at its cinemas in the Temple Bar quarter of Dublin. It maintains an archive of Irish films and provides education in film culture.

The IFI increases the range of films available to Irish audiences. New releases, national seasons, directors' retrospectives, thematic programmes, festivals, and special events have been regular features of the programme. Every year, the IFI rewards its audiences by hosting an Open Day, with free cinema screenings and tours. In 2011, the IFI was awarded Dublin's Best Cinema in Dublin Living Awards. In its first two decades the IFI saw over 3.1 million cinema attendances to see 63,000 screenings of over 5,900 different films. The IFI Café Bar served over 1.78 million cups of tea and coffee to audiences that include over 8,000 members. The IFI Irish Film Archive contains 611 different collections with over 26,000 cans of films, the oldest of which, a Lumiere brothers film of Dublin and Belfast, dates back to 1897. 

The IFI is a company limited by guarantee with charitable status.

History
The building in which the IFI now exists was once part of the old Friends' Meeting House, operated by Dublin's Quaker Community. The Meeting House was visited by Frederick Douglass, the anti-slavery leader, in September 1845 as a guest of the Quakers while he was on a visit promoting his book Narrative of the Life of Frederick Douglass, an American Slave. A plaque commemorating the event was unveiled by Dublin Lord Mayor Alison Gilliland on 21 October 2021.

The National Film Institute (NFI, now the IFI) was founded in 1943 and officially incorporated on 2 June 1945. While the other leading film organisation of the time, the Irish Film Society, was interested in interpreting and understanding the art of cinema, the NFI saw itself as the teacher and moral guardian of the cinema-going public.

Under Archbishop McQuaid's direction, the NFI not only maintained a distributing library of films available to schools, colleges and associations around the country, but also became involved in the production of safety, health and educational films in the 1940s, '50s and '60s. Many of these were commissioned by government departments to offer information on matters of public health and safety, personal finance, and on historical and cultural subjects. The Institute also produced numerous educational 'filmstrips' for use in the classroom by teachers. Also notable is a series of films recording the highlights of All-Ireland Hurling and Football Finals between 1947 and 1979.

By the early 1980s, Church influence within the NFI had declined, and in 1982, the decision was made to delete references to the Vigilanti Cura from the articles of association to reflect the now secular nature of the Institute, and to rename the organisation as the Irish Film Institute (IFI). While it was clear that the Irish Film Institute was no longer concerned with the morals of its audience, education through (and about) film was still a significant part of its remit: an education department was developed with the aim of bringing a broader and deeper experience of cinema to audiences of all ages and abilities, from primary school children to senior citizens.

At this time of reinvention and reinvigoration, a campaign to create the Irish Film Centre (IFC) as a home for the Institute and other organisations dealing with film culture got underway, and an 18th-century Quaker Meeting House was acquired in the regenerated area of Temple Bar in Dublin. The Irish Film Centre (which is still home to the IFI) was opened in Eustace Street on 23 September 1992 by the then Taoiseach Albert Reynolds.

Aside from providing the IFI with a centrally located public space with (then) two cinemas, a film shop and café bar, the new venue allowed the Institute to develop other aspects of its activities in addition to its main exhibition programme, such as the education, festivals and retrospective programmes. The location also provided the IFI Irish Film Archive with custom-built storage and research facilities, thereby ensuring that it was recognised as an essential part of the IFI, safeguarding its collections and increasing public access to its holdings.

In 2009, the IFI underwent an extensive redevelopment, supported by the Department of Arts, Sport and Tourism ACCESS II Scheme, which expanded its facilities to include a third cinema and new archive research facilities.

In 2020 Saoirse Ronan was named the inaugural ambassador for the Irish Film Institute, a new three-year role advocating for the IFI's work in Exhibition, Preservation, and Education. Ronan has received 10 Irish Film and Television Award nominations in her career, and won nine. Ronan holds the record for the most IFTA awards won by an individual since the Awards ceremony began in 2003.

IFI Irish Film Archive & Library
The IFI Irish Film Archive acquires, preserves and makes available Ireland's moving image heritage. Film reels, digital materials and document collections are held in vaults designed for the long-term storage of archival materials.

Named in honour of Tiernan MacBride in recognition of his contribution to the Irish film industry, the Library holds one of the largest collections of film related publications in Ireland. The collection includes a wide range of books, journals, and reports covering both international and Irish cinema. The Library's collections are reference only, researchers, students, teachers, filmmakers and members of the public are all welcome to use the Library.

IFI International
IFI International provides Irish film programming services for cultural exhibitors worldwide. Drawing on the collections of the IFI Irish Film Archive and liaising with Irish film directors, producers and distributors, IFI International provides access for cultural exhibitors to new and classic Irish cinema. distributing archival and cultural cinema to international venues and has programmed work in New York's MoMA and Lincoln Centre, New Delhi, Moscow, Brussels and Poland, to name a few.

Supported by Culture Ireland, IFI International works with over 100 exhibition partners in more than 40 countries annually to strategically develop a global audience for Irish film culture.

Other activities

The IFI also provides a venue for debate and acts as a meeting place for a variety of groups. A series of public interviews has brought many international filmmakers and actors to IFI audiences over the years, including John Woo, Peter Greenaway, Dennis Hopper, Atom Egoyan, Sydney Pollack, Tim Roth, Joel Schumacher, Juliette Binoche, John C. Reilly, U2's Larry Mullen Jr. and Claude Miller. Evening courses offer opportunities to explore everything from Indian cinema and America independents to Spanish film, with lectures following each screening. Throughout the month, the IFI offers a wide range of activities and special screenings, including: The IFI Film Club (post-screening discussion), The Bigger Picture (A film chosen by a guest as a notable film canon), Wild Strawberries (morning screenings for the senior audiences), IFI Family (family-friendly films), Irish Focus (monthly showcase of new Irish film, often followed by a Q&A with filmmakers), Archive at Lunchtime (free archive screenings), Feast Your Eyes (dinner club screenings), Mystery Matinee (a surprise film each month), From the Vaults (a film from the archives) Afternoon Talks, Monthly Must-See Cinema, Experimental Film Club and others. 
Films from the IFI Irish Film Archive are subsequently restored and released on DVD over the years, including Seoda, GAA Gold, GAA Hurling Gold, GAA Football Gold, Irish Destiny, The O’Kalem Collection.

Technology

In 2009, the IFI improved its facilities, including the introduction of digital sound, larger screens in each cinema, and the installation of Ireland's only functioning 70mm projection system in Cinema 1. The IFI is the only cinema in the country screening films in all possible formats – from Digibeta, DVD, Blu-ray and DCP, to 8, 16, 35 or 70mm. It also screens film in 3D.

Financial model

The IFI operates a model of cultural enterprise, using core Arts Council subsidy to procure diverse income streams which are then invested back into core activities to minimise the impact to the public of Arts Council funding. The Arts Council's support of the IFI generates significant returns to the State, both economically and culturally. In 2010 the IFI used public subsidy of €800,000 to run a cultural organisation that employs 60 people and has an annual turnover of just over €3 million.

Patrons
President Michael D. Higgins is the honorary Patron of the IFI.

Venue

There are three cinemas: Cinema 1 has a capacity of 258; Cinema 2 holds 106 people; and Cinema 3 seats 58.

References

External links 
 Irish Film Institute
 Association of European Film Archives and Cinematheques

Cinemas in Dublin (city)
Film archives in the Republic of Ireland
Libraries in the Republic of Ireland
DVD companies